Ivan Šuker (born 12 November 1957) is a Croatian politician and economist. He served as Minister of Finance from 2003 to 2010, as a member of the Croatian Democratic Union. He currently resides in Velika Gorica.

He served as the president of the Croatian Basketball Federation for two terms, from 2002 to 2004 and from 2015 to 2016, when he was replaced by the famous Croatian basketball player Stojko Vranković.

Education
Šuker was born in Gornji Rujani near the village of Lištani, Livno municipality, Bosnia and Herzegovina. He graduated from the Faculty of Economics and Business of the University of Zagreb in 1983.

Professional experience

2010–present, member of Croatian Parliament
2003–2010, Minister of Finance of Republic of Croatia
2000–2003, member of Croatian Parliament's Finances and Budget Board
2000–2003, Mayor of Velika Gorica
1997–2000, Zagreb County Deputy Ruler
1990–2000, Head of the Local Tax Office Velika Gorica
1986–1990, Finance Director in Velika Gorica
1984–1986, Chief Accountant of the Budget Department of Velika Gorica Municipality

Political career

2009–2010, elected as Vice Prime Minister of the Government of the Republic of Croatia
2003–2010, Minister of Finance of Republic of Croatia
2002, At the 7th General Convention of the Croatian Democratic Union (HDZ), elected as a Deputy Chairman of the Party
2000–2003, Mayor of Velika Gorica
2000–2013, President of Velika Gorica Town Board of the Croatian Democratic Union (HDZ)
2000, At the 5th General Convention of the Croatian Democratic Union (HDZ), elected as a member of the Party Presidency
2000, In the January elections, elected as a member of the Croatian Parliament, member of the Finance and Central Budget Committee, member of the Local and Regional Self-government Committee
1997–2000, Zagreb County Deputy Ruler
1993–1997, External member of the Zagreb City Government
1991–1992, President of the Velika Gorica Crisis Headquarters during Croatian War of Independence
1990–1991, Member of the Executive Council of the Velika Gorica Municipality Assembly

Sports career
2002–2004, 
2015–2016, President of the Croatian Basketball Federation
20??–20??, President of KK Gorica

Miscellaneous
Šuker speaks English fluently. His favorite hobby is basketball and for several years he served as chairman of Croatian Basketball Association. Šuker and famous football player Davor Šuker are paternal cousins.

References

1957 births
Croats of Bosnia and Herzegovina
Living people
Croatian Democratic Union politicians
20th-century Croatian economists
People from Livno
Faculty of Economics and Business, University of Zagreb alumni
Finance ministers of Croatia
Croatian sports executives and administrators
Basketball executives
Yugoslav economists
21st-century Croatian economists